Metisella medea, the Medea sylph, is a butterfly in the family Hesperiidae. It is found in Nigeria, Cameroon, the Democratic Republic of the Congo, Uganda, Kenya, Tanzania and Malawi. The habitat consists of submontane meadows.

The larvae feed on Poaceae species.

Subspecies
Metisella medea medea (Nigeria, Uganda, Kenya, Tanzania, eastern Democratic Republic of Congo)
Metisella medea nyika Evans, 1937 (Tanzania: southern highlands, Malawi: Nyika Plateau)

References

Butterflies described in 1937
Heteropterinae